This is a list of all reigning monarchs in the history of Russia. It includes the princes of medieval Rus′, tsars, and emperors of Russia. The list begins with the semi-legendary prince Rurik of Novgorod, sometime in the mid 9th century ( 862) and ends with emperor Nicholas II who abdicated in 1917, and was executed with his family in 1918.

The vast territory known today as Russia covers an area that has been ruled by various polities, including Kievan Rus', the Grand Duchy of Moscow, the Tsardom of Russia and the Russian Empire, and the sovereigns of these many nations and throughout their histories have used likewise as wide a range of titles in their positions as chief magistrates of a country. Some of the earliest titles include kniaz and velikiy kniaz, which mean "prince" and "grand prince" respectively but are often rendered as "duke" and "grand duke" in Western literature; then the title of tsar, meaning "caesar", which was disputed to be the equal of either a king or emperor; finally culminating in the title of emperor. According to Article 59 of the 1906 Russian Constitution, the Russian emperor held several dozen titles, each one representing a region which the monarch governed.

Rurikids, 862–1598 

Parts of the land that is today known as Russia was populated by various East Slavic peoples from before the 9th century. The first states to exert hegemony over the region were those of the Rus' people, a branch of Nordic Varangians who entered the region occupied by modern Russia sometime in the ninth century, and set up a series of states starting with the Rus' Khaganate circa 830. Little is known of the Rus' Khaganate beyond its existence, including the extent of its territory or any reliable list of its khagans (rulers).

Princes of Novgorod

Traditionally, Rus' statehood is traced to Rurik, Rus' leader of Novgorod (modern Veliky Novgorod), a different Rus' state.

Grand princes of Kiev

Rurik's successor Oleg moved his capital to Kiev (now Ukraine), founding the state of Kievan Rus'. Over the next several centuries, the most important titles were Grand Prince of Kiev and Grand Prince of Novgorod whose holder (often the same person) could claim hegemony.

Feudal period 
The gradual disintegration of Rus' began in the 11th century, after the death of Yaroslav the Wise. The position of the Grand Prince was weakened by the growing influence of regional clans. In 1097, the Council of Liubech formalized the feudal nature of the Rus' lands.

After Mstislav's death in 1132, the Kievan Rus' fell into recession and a rapid decline. The throne of Kiev became an object of struggle between various territorial associations of Rurikid princes.

In March 1169, a coalition of native princes led by the Grand Prince of Vladimir-Suzdal — Andrei of Vladimir — sacked Kiev and forced the ruling prince — Mstislav II of Kiev — to flee to Volhynia. Andrei appointed his brother — Gleb of Kiev — as Prince of Kiev while Andrei himself continued to rule his realm from Vladimir on Klyazma. From that time onwards, north-eastern Rus', which was centered on the city of Vladimir, became one of the most influential Rus' lands. In the south-west, the Principality (later the kingdom) of Galicia-Volhynia began to emerge as the local successor to Kiev. Following the Mongol invasions, three powerful states remained as the successors of Kievan Rus': the Principality of Vladimir-Suzdal in the north east — which would evolve into the Principality of Muscovy; the Kingdom of Galicia–Volhynia in the south-west; and the Grand Duchy of Lithuania to the north.

Grand Princes of Vladimir

By the 12th century, the Grand Duchy of Vladimir became the dominant principality in Northwest Rus, adding its name to those of Novgorod and Kiev, culminating with the rule of Alexander Nevsky. In 1169 Prince Andrey I of Vladimir sacked the city of Kiev and took over the title of the grand prince to claim primacy in Rus'.

Kievan Rus' finally disintegrated under the pressure of the Mongol invasion of 1237–1242. Its successor principalities started paying tribute to the Golden Horde (the so-called Tatar Yoke). From the mid-13th to mid-15th centuries, princes of northeastern Rus' received a yarlyk (a special edict of Golden Horde khan).

Alexander Nevsky was the last prince to reign directly from Vladimir. After his death, Northeastern Rus′ fell apart into a dozen principalities. The territory of the Grand Duchy of Vladimir proper was received by the Horde to one of the appanage princes, who performed the enthronement ceremony in Vladimir, but remained to live and reign in his own principality. By the end of the century, only three cities – Moscow, Tver, and Nizhny Novgorod – still contended for the title of Grand Prince of Vladimir.

After Dmitry the throne of Vladimir was succeeded only by princes of Moscow.

Grand Princes of Moscow
The Grand Duchy of Moscow, founded by Alexander Nevsky's youngest son Daniel, began to consolidate control over the entire Rus' territory in the 14th century. The Russians began to exert independence from the Mongols, culminating with Ivan III ceasing tribute to the Horde, effectively declaring his independence. His son Vasili III completed the task of uniting all of Russia by annexing the last few independent states in the 1520s.

Tsars of Russia 
Ivan the Terrible assumed the title Tsar of all Rus' in 1547, whereby the Tsardom of Russia (apart from its constituent principalities) was established.

Time of Troubles, 1598—1613 
Following the death of the Feodor I, the son of Ivan the Terrible and the last of the Rurik dynasty, Russia fell into a succession crisis.  As Feodor left no male heirs, the Russian Zemsky Sobor (feudal parliament) elected his brother-in-law Boris Godunov to be Tsar.

Tsars of Russia 

Devastated by famine, rule under Boris descended into anarchy. A series of impostors, known as the False Dmitrys, each claimed to be Feodor I's long deceased younger brother; however, only the first impostor ever took the capital and sat on the throne. A distant Rurikid cousin, Vasily Shuysky, also took power for a time. During this period, foreign powers deeply involved themselves in Russian politics, under the leadership of the Vasa monarchs of Sweden and Poland-Lithuania, including Sigismund III Vasa and his son Władysław. As a child, Władysław was even chosen as Tsar by the council of aristocracy, though he was prevented by his father from formally taking the throne. The Time of Troubles is considered to have ended with the election of Michael Romanov to the throne in February 1613.

Tsars of Russia

Romanovs, 1613–1917

Tsars of Russia 
The Time of Troubles came to a close with the election of Michael Romanov as Tsar in 1613 to the Tsardom of Russia. Michael officially reigned as Tsar, though his father, the Patriarch Philaret (died 1633) initially held the real power. However, Michael's descendants would rule Russia, first as Tsars and later as Emperors, until the Russian Revolution of 1917. Peter the Great (reigned 1682–1725), a grandson of Michael Romanov, reorganized the Russian state along more Western lines, establishing the Russian Empire in 1721.

Emperors of Russia 
(Also Grand Princes of Finland from 1809 until 1917; and Kings of Poland from 1815 until 1917)

The Empire of Russia was declared by Peter the Great in 1721.  Officially, Russia would be ruled by the Romanov dynasty until the Russian Revolution of 1917.  However, direct male descendants of Michael Romanov came to an end in 1730 with the death of Peter II of Russia, grandson of Peter the Great.  The throne passed to Anna, a niece of Peter the Great, and after the brief rule of her niece's infant son Ivan VI, the throne was seized by Elizabeth, a daughter of Peter the Great.  Elizabeth would be the last of the direct Romanovs to rule Russia.  Elizabeth declared her nephew, Peter, to be her heir.  Peter (who would rule as Peter III) spoke little Russian, having been a German prince of the House of Holstein-Gottorp before arriving in Russia to assume the Imperial title.  He and his German wife Sophia changed their name to Romanov upon inheriting the throne.  Peter was ill-liked, and he was assassinated within six months of assuming the throne, in a coup orchestrated by his wife, who became Empress in her own right and ruled as Catherine the Great (both Peter and Catherine were descended from the House of Rurik).  Following the confused successions of the descendants of Peter the Great, Catherine's son Paul I established clear succession laws which governed the rules of primogeniture over the Imperial throne until the fall of the Empire in 1917.

Pretenders after Nicholas II 

The rights of Kirill Vladimirovich and his heirs to the imperial throne of Russia have been repeatedly questioned following his marriage with Princess Victoria Melita of Saxe-Coburg and Gotha. The principles laid down by Paul I in the Act of Succession 1797 turned out to be not completely flawlessly formulated, and, as a result, the interpretation of these is not always obvious, and Russia now has no indisputable contender for the throne. Moreover, for more than a hundred years the throne itself has ceased to exist. Nevertheless, when in 1915 Nicholas II, before the lack of successible Grand-Dukes, allowed them to retain their personal rights, as it had happened in practice with Alexander II after his second and morganatic marriage, Kirill Vladimirovich's issue was never deemed to be considered morganatic, nor were they demoted from Grand-Dukes to mere Princes.

Timeline of monarchs

See also 

 List of Ukrainian rulers
 Grand Prince of Kiev
 Grand Duke of Vladimir
 Family tree of Russian monarchs
 List of Russian royal consorts
 List of heads of state of Russia (1917–)
 List of leaders of the Russian SFSR (1917–1991)
 List of leaders of the Soviet Union (1922–1991)
 List of presidents of Russia (1991–)
 Prime Minister of Russia
 List of heads of government of Russia
 Premier of the Soviet Union

Notes

References

Further reading
 Bibliography of the history of the Early Slavs and Rus'
 Bibliography of Russian history (1223–1613)
 List of Slavic studies journals

External links 
Godunov to Nicholas II by Saul Zaklad
 Principality of Vladimir-Suzdal
Timeline of Russian Emperors and Empresses
History of Russian imperial titles. Bibliography

Russian rulers
Russia
Rulers
Russia
Russian Empire

Russ